Elachista ossuaria is a moth of the family Elachistidae that is found in Alberta, Yukon, Arizona, Colorado, Montana and Wyoming.

The forewing costa in the basal 1/6 is grey. The ground colour is unicolorous yellowish-white. The hindwings are light grey, while the underside of the wings is grey.

Etymology
The species name is derived from Latin ossuarius (meaning of bone).

References

Moths described in 1997
ossuaria
Endemic fauna of the United States
Moths of North America